Brylkinieae is a tribe of grasses, containing a single genus, Brylkinia. It used to be placed in tribe Meliceae, and had previously included a second genus, Koordersiochloa.

References

External links
 
 

Pooideae
Poaceae tribes
Monotypic plant taxa